Amin Jahan Alian (born 16 June 1991) is an Iranian footballer who plays as a winger or attacking midfielder.

Club career
He joined Sepahan in the summer of 2012. From 2009 to 2012 he was a member of Sepahan under-21 football team.

Club career statistics

Honours
Sepahan
 Hazfi Cup: 2012–13
 Iran Pro League: 2014–15

References

1991 births
Living people
Iranian footballers
Sportspeople from Isfahan
Association football midfielders
Sepahan S.C. footballers
Aluminium Arak players
Malavan players
Persian Gulf Pro League players
Azadegan League players
Olympic footballers of Iran